Pareiorhaphis lophia is a species of catfish in the family Loricariidae. It is native to South America, where it occurs in the Paraguaçu River basin in Brazil. It is typically found in shallow rocky stretches of coastal blackwater rivers, including rapids. It is known to be syntopic with Hypostomus chrysostiktos and Hypostomus jaguar. The species reaches 8.2 cm (3.2 inches) in standard length and is believed to be a facultative air-breather.

References 

Loricariidae
Fish described in 2014
Catfish of South America
Fish of Brazil